A salamander is an amphibian defined by the presence of a tail and their resemblance to lizards.

Salamander may also refer to:

In mythology 
 Salamander (legendary creature)

In arts and entertainment

In film, television, and stage
 Salamander (anime), a video mini-series
 Salamander (TV series), from Belgium
 Salamander (film), a 1928 Soviet-German silent biopic film 
 The Salamander (1971 film), a Swiss film directed by Alain Tanner
 The Salamander (1981 film), starring Anthony Quinn
 A fictional character in the Doctor Who serial The Enemy of the World
 Fiametta, a ballet also known as The Salamander, first presented in 1863

In gaming
 Salamander (video game), a scrolling shooter arcade game
 Salamander 2, its sequel
 Salamander (Dungeons & Dragons), a fictional creature
 Salamanders (Warhammer 40,000), a fictional military force

In literature
The Salamander, a novel by Owen Johnson that was also adapted into films
 Salamander (novel), 2002, by Thomas Wharton
 Salamander: A Miscellany of Poetry, a 1947 anthology
 Salamander, a literary magazine at Suffolk University
 The nickname of fictional character Natsu Dragneel in the manga Fairy Tail
 The nickname of fictional character Honor Harrington

In music
 A song by Ellegarden on their album Eleven Fire Crackers
 A song by Jethro Tull on their album Too Old to Rock 'n' Roll: Too Young to Die!

Places
 Salamander Range, a mountain range in Victoria Land, Antarctica
 The Salamander Glacier, Montana, United States
 Salamander Point, Bellingshausen Island, South Sandwich Islands

Ships
 Salamander of Leith (1537), a ship of the Old Scots Navy
 HMS Salamander, any of several Royal Navy ships
 Salamander, British Royal Navy fireship, convict transport to Australia, whaler, and slave ship

Technology
 Salamander (metallurgy), materials in the hearth of a blast furnace below its tap hole
 Salamander heater, a portable space heater
 Salamander broiler, a type of grilling equipment
 Altap Salamander, file management software
 Alvis Salamander, a fire engine
 Sopwith Salamander, a First World War aircraft
 Salamander, code name for the construction program for the Heinkel He 162, a Second World War German jet aircraft
 Salamander, a .NET decompiler

Other uses
 Salamander Energy, a British-based oil and gas company
 SV Salamander Türkheim, a German association football club
 The nickname given by Winston Churchill to Bernard Freyberg, 1st Baron Freyberg

See also
 The salamander letter, a 1980s-era forgery intended to discredit the Latter Day Saints movement and its founder, Joseph Smith
 La Salamandre (disambiguation)